The 6th Reserve Officers' Training Corps Brigade is an Army Reserve Officers' Training Corps brigade based at Hunter Army Airfield, Georgia. It provides training support and oversight to all Army ROTC and Junior ROTC units in the states of Alabama, Georgia, Florida, Louisiana, Mississippi, and Puerto Rico.

Organization
The brigade comprises several ROTC battalions throughout the listed states. However, each ROTC unit is generally smaller than a battalion, as each contains around 100 cadets on average. The brigade commands 43 such battalions located at universities throughout the south. Additionally, the brigade commands 214 Junior Reserve Officer Training Corps programs throughout the five states and Puerto Rico. JROTC "battalions" are usually larger than their Senior ROTC counterparts, on average comprising over 150 cadets each.

Battalions

Alabama 
 Alabama A&M University
 Auburn University
 Auburn University at Montgomery
 Jacksonville State University
 The University of Alabama
 Tuskegee University
 University of Alabama at Birmingham
 University of North Alabama
 University of South Alabama

Florida 
 Embry-Riddle Aeronautical University
 Florida Agricultural and Mechanical University
 Florida Institute of Technology
 Florida International University
 Florida Southern College
 Florida State University
 University of Central Florida
 University of Florida
 University of South Florida
 University of Tampa
 University of West Florida

Georgia 
 Augusta State University
 Columbus State University
 Fort Valley State University
 Georgia Institute of Technology
 Georgia Southern University
 Georgia State University
 University of Georgia

Louisiana 
 Grambling State University
 Louisiana State University
 Northwestern State University
 Southern University and A&M College
 Tulane University

Mississippi 
 Alcorn State University
 Jackson State University
 Mississippi State University
 University of Mississippi
 University of Southern Mississippi

Puerto Rico 
 University of Puerto Rico - Mayaguez
 University of Puerto Rico - Rio Piedras

References

Reserve Officers' Training Corps